Buck Angel (born June 5, 1962) is an American pornographic film actor, producer and sex educator. He is the founder of the media production company Buck Angel Entertainment. A transsexual man, he received the 2007 AVN Award as Transsexual Performer of the Year; he now works as an advocate and educator. Angel served on the board of directors of the Woodhull Freedom Foundation from 2010 to 2016; the foundation works to affirm sexual freedom as a fundamental human right through advocacy and education.

Early life
Angel was born in the San Fernando Valley area of Los Angeles on June 5, 1962. He was born female and given a feminine name.  Growing up as a tomboy, his gender-atypical behavior during childhood was generally accepted at home, but as his secondary sex characteristics continued to develop around age 16, his home and school life became increasingly tense. He was subjected to bullying in school, due to gender non-conforming behavior and clothing. Angel described the bullying as harming his communication skills as a result of psychological distress. To cope with his distress, he used alcohol and marijuana as a means of self-medication.

After a suicidal gesture in high school, Angel's parents sent him to therapy. They thought that he needed help because he claimed to have reached a point of "total disconnection" from society. This was not well received by his family, and according to Angel, "They were going to put me in a mental institution." Unaware of the existence of treatments for gender dysphoria such as hormone replacement therapy, he lived for years trying to conform to expectations of femininity, during which time he took drugs and drank alcohol. Though he was employed as a female professional model, he was generally dissatisfied with his identity and existence, and "was not loving life". He turned to running as a means of isolation and source of validation.

Gender transition 
Angel was unable to find appropriate help for completing his gender transition during his adolescent years. He eventually met a therapist who affirmed his gender instead of viewing him as a "gay woman". Angel began researching various methods of medical transition, and began this process at the age of 28. Angel and his therapist got in contact with an endocrinologist who worked primarily with transgender women as opposed to transgender men. This was because Angel was one of the earliest trans men to be allowed hormonal transition, due to which there was limited data on prior cases like his. Angel was, as his doctor stated, "going to be my guinea pig" (for human subject research), where experimentation was the main course of action in helping him. From then on, Angel's doctor began prescribing him test dosages of testosterone throughout a six-month period until a value solidified to fit his needs. Eventually, he was taking 1-cc doses of testosterone every 10 days.

Afterward, Angel began focusing on his physical appearance and searched for a surgeon that dealt with upper-body modifications to remove his breasts. Bottom surgery was another aspect he was looking to change, because he wanted to have a penis to fit the male schema. He later realized that there was no sufficient technology at the time to create what he desired. He chose not to undergo genital surgery and currently considers his medical transition complete. Later on, however, Buck chose to undergo a hysterectomy.

Adult film career

Angel began to produce and star in his own line of adult films under the imprint Buck Angel Entertainment. By this time, he identified and presented as male, but had not had genital surgery; he thus promoted these works describing himself as "the Man with a Pussy", which became his trademark.

In 2005, he appeared in the Titan Media release Cirque Noir, becoming the first trans man to be featured in an all-male film produced by a company specializing in gay male porn. The same year he performed in Allanah Starr's Big Boob Adventures (directed by transgender woman Gia Darling), which featured the first filmed sex scene between a trans woman (Allanah Starr) and a trans man. The performance was nominated for "Most Outrageous Sex Scene" at the AVN Awards. In 2007 Angel became the first and only trans man to win Transsexual Performer of the Year at the AVN Awards. His 2008 performance in Buckback Mountain received nominations for "Best Alternative Release" and "Best Specialty Release" at the GayVN Awards. Angel also appears in Naked, a 2008 documentary book and film about the adult film industry, by director Ed Powers. In the film, he appears in a sex scene with porn star Wolf Hudson, produced by mainstream photographer Justin Lubin.

Educational work 

Angel's pornographic content was one of the building blocks that set the foundation for his future educational demonstrations, and is credited as broadening the perceptions of sexuality and gender in both the industry and the minds of consumers, an effect he was unaware of until a few years into his work. With passing time, his work in porn evolved into advocacy.

Angel found the transition between his work as a porn actor and his work as an educational role model difficult, due to the stigma surrounding a career based on sexual content. Angel's identity as a porn star made it difficult for him to express his ideas, as he felt that he could not speak on behalf of himself; the porn industry also struggled with placing his new role as a sex educator.

In time, Angel had the opportunity to be a guest speaker for Ideacity in 2010—Canada's "premier meeting of the minds”"—where he spoke on the physical changes and emotional adaptation he had experienced as a result of transition. Angel used his presentation to challenge societal ideas of what makes a man through use of his own experiences, highlighting the strict and unwavering constructs of masculinity in much of Western society, and how he was considered to not fall under these constructs simply for having a vagina.

In 2012, Angel began to transition from the porn industry to sex education and began touring the world speaking about human sexuality. His presentation, "Bucking the System", aimed to re-define traditional notions of gender by educating his audience about gender fluidity and identity politics. Angel also began touring Q&A sessions about his documentary, Sexing the Transman, and his autobiographical film "Mr. Angel". He has made appearances at many universities around the world, as well as Pride events and film festivals. He has spoken at Sex Week at Yale University and at IdeaCity10 in Toronto.

In October 2010, Angel contributed to sex educator and columnist Dan Savage's "It Gets Better" project by uploading his personal coming out story to YouTube. He has also produced multiple public service announcements on the topics of positive body image, LGBTQ family acceptance, queer people of colour and transgender health and well-being. Angel also engages in education about safe sex for trans men.

In 2012, Angel became a contributor to The Feminist Porn Book, an anthology by feminist scholars and sex workers about understanding pornography and how feminists direct, act in, produce and consume porn.

Between 2010 and 2015, he created an award-winning series about trans male sexuality called Sexing the Transman XXX, which is now in its fourth installment. This film won "Most Tantalizing Trans Film" at the Feminist Porn Awards in 2012.

Angel has been publicly critical of several areas of LGBT policy advocacy, in particular relating to sex-based spaces and institutions. His criticisms include the participation of trans women in female sports, demands for access for trans women to female-only spaces, and political use of the phrase 'trans women are women'.

Other activities
Angel has appeared on various talk shows including those of Howard Stern, Tyra Banks, and Maury Povich; as well as Secret Lives of Women in the US, the Morning Show in the UK, and the Jensen Show in the Netherlands.

British artist Marc Quinn included a life-size sculpture of Angel in his global tour. Angel posed for Quinn's sculpture series on human transformations in 2010; the series was revealed at London's White Cube gallery. He was featured in four different bronze sculptures including two solo pieces, and two with Allanah Starr. The life-sized sculpture of Angel is now a permanent fixture at the Art Gallery of South Australia.

In 2012 he created a dating website for trans men called BuckAngelDating.com, because "there was still no special dating site catering to the unique needs of trans men."

Angel created "Trantastic Storytelling" in 2015, a service which offers opportunities for trans people to share their life experiences for educational purposes.

In 2015, Angel and Leon Mostovoy founded the cannabis brand Pride Wellness, which would donate to charity a dollar from each product sold. They ended the venture in 2021, citing competition from big corporations.

In 2016, Angel partnered with Perfect Fit Brand to create a sex toy specifically for trans men. The product is meant to reduce gender dysphoria and help trans men connect with their bodies and their sexuality.

In 2020, Angel launched a cannabis delivery service, Wings Of Wellness, aimed at LGBTQ customers.

Personal life
Angel is bisexual. He was married to San Francisco-based dominatrix Karin Winslow (known professionally as Ilsa Strix). He filed for divorce after Winslow left him for film director Lana Wachowski, who was a client of hers.

Angel met his second wife, body piercer Elayne, on a dating website. The two married in New Orleans on November 17, 2003. Elayne filed for divorce in May 2014. Angel claimed that Elayne had moved $500,000 out of their joint bank account and requested $2,000 in monthly spousal support. In an effort to avoid alimony payments, Elayne claimed that their marriage should not have been legally recognized as Louisiana did not recognize same-sex marriage in 2003; Angel has never had his genitals surgically altered and his birth certificate was not updated to male until after their marriage. In August 2014, the California Superior Court ruled that their marriage was valid due to the ambiguity in Louisiana's statute regarding sex reassignment surgery, which might include the "top surgery" that Angel had already received.

In February 2021, Angel was a witness to Lady Gaga's dog walker being shot and two of Gaga's French Bulldogs being stolen in Hollywood.

Awards and nominations
In January 2007, Buck Angel won Transsexual Performer of the Year at the AVN Awards.
In 2008, 2009, and 2010, he was nominated for Transsexual Performer of the Year. He remains the only FTM transsexual ever to have been nominated for or to win this award. 
In April 2008, he was presented with a "Feminist Porn Award" for "Boundary Breaker of the Year."
In 2012, he won the Feminist Porn Award for his groundbreaking film Sexing The Transman XXX.
In 2012, he won Best FTM Performer of the Year at the Transgender Erotica Awards. This is the first year this award was given.
In 2015, he won the PORyes Award (Feminist Pornfilmpreis Europe) in Berlin
In 2015, he won the Ida Feldman award at the 23rd Brazil Mix Festival
In 2016, he was given an Honorary Award at the Tel Aviv Film Festival
In 2017, he received the XBIZ award for "Specialty Product/Line of the Year Award"
In 2017, he was given the "Outstanding Innovation Award" at the AVN "O" Awards
In 2017, Angel and Valentina Nappi won the AVN Award for "Best Transsexual Scene" for the film Girl/Boy 2

Partial filmography

Adult films
2004: Buck's Beaver
2005: The Adventures of Buck Naked
2005: Cirque Noir
2005: Allanah Starr's Big Boob Adventures
2006: Buck Off
2006: V for Vagina
2006: The Buck Stops Here
2007: Even More Bang for Your Buck Vol.1
2008: Even More Bang for your Buck Vol.2
2008: Buckback Mountain
2009: Ultimate Fucking Club Vol. 1
2009: Ultimate Fucking Club Vol.2
2010–12: Sexing The Transman XXX Series
2016: Girl/Boy (Evil Angel)

Documentaries
2008: NAKED
2012: Sexing the Transman
2013: Mr. Angel
2016: The Trans List (HBO)
2016: Finding Kim
2016: BLOWN

Mainstream media
 1993: Porno for Pyros - "Cursed Female"
 2015: "Technical Difficulties of Intimacy"
 2016: Appeared in the video for "Bi", a song by Alicia Champion.
 2016: Loki Starfish – "Shivers are Proof (Paris)"

References

External links
 
 

American pornographic film producers
1962 births
Bisexual male pornographic film actors
Bisexual men
Living people
American LGBT businesspeople
LGBT people from California
LGBT producers
American LGBT writers
Transgender male actors
Transgender pornographic film actors
Sex educators
American motivational speakers
AVN Award winners
Transgender Erotica Award winners
21st-century American LGBT people
American male pornographic film actors